The Sherut Avir (Air Service) was the air force of the Haganah and the forerunner of the Israeli Air Force.

Founding
The Sherut Avir was founded on 10 November 1947, just two weeks prior to the passing of the 1947 UN Partition Plan on 29 November which proposed the division of Palestine into a Jewish state and an Arab state.
It was at this time that Haganah leaders brought the Palmach's air branch, the Palavir out of hiding, recognizing the need for an air arm if a Jewish State was established.  However, the Sherut Avir would have to be built from scratch.  Because of this, its initial strength in comparison with some neighboring air forces, especially Egypt, was quite insignificant.  By the time of Israel's declaration of statehood in May 1948, the Sherut Avir had only 25 aircraft.  Most of them had come from Aviron, the first Jewish airline in Palestine established in 1936.  While Aviron itself was not part of the Haganah, they had worked closely together in liaison, reconnaissance, and medical missions.  Between late-1947 and mid-1948, as tensions mounted before the 1948 Arab-Israeli War, Aviron transferred all of its aircraft to the fledgling air force.
The second problem faced by the Sherut Avir was a lack of trained airmen and ground crew.  Only a handful of mechanics, engineers, pilots, former-RAF servicemen, and Histadrut personnel filled the initial ranks.

Operations
The Sherut Avir set up headquarters on Tel Aviv's Montefiore Street and began its air operations just outside at Sde Dov Airport. Its first combat came quickly; just before Christmas, on December 17, 1947, pilot Pinchas Ben-Porat boarded his single-engine RWD-13 to ferry a medical doctor to the small town of Beit Eshel. Once he completed that leg of the mission, Ben-Porat was supposed to fly to Nevatim, but learning that 200 Arabs were assaulting it, he removed the doors of his aircraft to install a Bren Gun, and with a volunteer gunner and some hand grenades, took off for the village.

See also
Aviron flying school, prepared civilian and military pilots in the 1930s and 40s
Galilee Squadron, Sherut Avir unit during the 1948 Arab-Israeli War

References

Further reading
Senior, Boris. New Heavens: My Life as a Fighter Pilot and a Founder of the Israel Air Force. Potomac Books, Inc., 2005. 

Irregular military air services
Military units and formations established in 1947
Aviation in Israel
Israeli Air Force
Haganah
1947 establishments in Mandatory Palestine